The Weehawken School District is a comprehensive community public school district consisting of three schools serving students in pre-kindergarten through twelfth grade from the Township of Weehawken, in Hudson County, New Jersey, United States.

As of the 2018–19 school year, the district, comprising three schools, had an enrollment of 1,458 students and 120.5 classroom teachers (on an FTE basis), for a student–teacher ratio of 12.1:1.

The district is classified by the New Jersey Department of Education as being in District Factor Group "CD", the sixth-highest of eight groupings. District Factor Groups organize districts statewide to allow comparison by common socioeconomic characteristics of the local districts. From lowest socioeconomic status to highest, the categories are A, B, CD, DE, FG, GH, I and J.

Awards, recognition and rankings
In 2017, the International Center for Leadership in Education named Weehawken “one of the twelve most innovative districts in the nation.” Niche.com ranked Weehawken 79th on its list of the top 100 school districts in New Jersey with each of the district's schools receiving an A rating. The Washington Post ranked Weehawken High School in the top 12% of all high schools in the United States --including 79th in the state and highest-ranked in Hudson County -- on its 2017 list of "America’s Most Challenging High Schools."

Schools 
Schools in the district (with 2018–19 enrollment data from the National Center for Education Statistics) are:

Elementary schools
Daniel Webster School served 418 students in PreK through 2nd grade
Anna Rudowsky, Principal
Theodore Roosevelt School served 420 students in grades 3-6
Suzanne Mera, Principal
High school
Weehawken High School served 569 students in grades 7-12
Robert Ferullo, Principal

Administration
Core members of the district's administration are:
Eric Crespo, Superintendent of Schools
Matthew Whitford, Business Administrator / Board Secretary

Board of education
The district's board of education, with nine members, sets policy and oversees the fiscal and educational operation of the district through its administration. As a Type II school district, the board's trustees are elected directly by voters to serve three-year terms of office on a staggered basis, with three seats up for election each year held as part of the April school election. As one of the 13 districts statewide with school elections in April, voters also decide on passage of the annual school budget.

References

External links 

Weehawken School District

School Data for the Weehawken School District, National Center for Education Statistics

Weehawken, New Jersey
New Jersey District Factor Group CD
School districts in Hudson County, New Jersey